Menachem Fisch is an Israeli philosopher. He is the Joseph and Ceil Mazer Professor Emeritus of History and Philosophy of Science, and co-Director of the Frankfurt-Tel Aviv Center for the Study of Religious and Interreligious Dynamics at Tel Aviv University. He is also Senior Fellow of the Goethe University's Forschungskolleg Humanwissenschaften, Bad Homburg.

Fisch has published widely on the history of 19th-century British science and mathematics, on confirmation theory, on rationality and agency, on the theology of the talmudic literature, and the philosophy of talmudic legal reasoning. In recent work he explores the limits of normative self-criticism, the Talmud's dialogism and dispute of religiosity, the historiography and narratology of scientific framework transitions, political emotions, and the possibility of articulating a pluralist and liberal political philosophy from within the assumptions of traditional Judaism. Fisch's current philosophical work focuses on reflexive emotions.

Fisch has been a member of the Institute for Advanced Study, Princeton, Fellow of the Wissenshaftskolleg, the Berlin Institute for Advanced Study, and the Dibner Institute for the History of Science and Technology, MIT, senior visiting fellow at Collegium Budapest, visiting scholar at Trinity College, Cambridge, and was a long-term senior research fellow at the Shalom Hartman Institute, Jerusalem.

Awards and honors
In 2016 Fisch was the recipient of The Humboldt Prize.

In 2017 he was awarded an honorary doctorate in religious philosophy from the Goethe University, Frankfurt.

In 2004 he delivered The Crown-Minnow Lectures, at the University of Notre Dame, and in January 2020 the Dagmar Westberg Lectures at the Goethe University, Frankfurt.

In 2016 A volume dedicated to his work, entitled Menachem Fisch: The Rationality of Religious Dispute, was published by Brill as Vol. 18 of The Library of Contemporary Jewish Philosophers, (eds. H. Samuelson-Tiroshi and A. W. Hughes), and in 2020, a collection of engagements with his work entitled: Changing One's Mind: Philosophy, Religion And Science, (edited by. Y. Schwartz, P. Franks and C. Wiese), was published as a special issue of Open Philosophy (3, 2020).

Publications

Books
William Whewell Philosopher of Science, Oxford University Press, 1991
William Whewell: A Composite Portrait, Oxford University Press, 1991 (edited with S.J. Schaffer)
To Know Wisdom - Science, Rationality and Torah-study, (Hebrew), Tel Aviv, 1994
Rational Rabbis: Science and Talmudic Culture, Indiana University Press, 1997
The View from Within: Normativity and the Limits of Self-Criticism, University of Notre Dame Press, 2011 (with Y. Benbaji)
Creatively Undecided: Toward a History and Philosophy of Scientific Agency, The University of Chicago Press, 2017
Covenant of Confrontation: A Study of Non-Submissive Religiosity in Rabbinic Literature (Hebrew), Bar Ilan University Press, 2019.
The Enemy Within: Political Zionism and its Faithful Adversaries (Hebrew), Tel Aviv University Press, 2021.
Dialogues of Reason: Science, Politics, Religion (The Dagmar Westberg Lectures 2020, with Responses by Julie E. Cooper, Lorraine Daston, Paul Franks, Suzanne Last Stone, Matthias Lutz-Bachmann, Thomas M. Schmidt, Claudia Welz, and Christian Wiese), Wuerzburg: Echter Verlag, (forthcoming) 2023.
Qohelet: Searching for a Life Worth Living, Waco TX: Baylor University Press, (forthcoming) 2023 (with Debra Band).

References

Living people
Israeli philosophers
Academic staff of Tel Aviv University
Academic staff of Goethe University Frankfurt
Philosophers of science
Jewish philosophers
1948 births